Tlell is a small, unincorporated area on the east coast of Graham Island, which is part of Haida Gwaii (formerly the Queen Charlotte Islands) in British Columbia, Canada.

History
Besides Mexican Tom, who set up camp at Tlell in 1904, Eric Richardson was one of – if not the first – to make this camp a permanent settlement, by establishing the Richardson Ranch, which is still active and on the spot.

Tlell was connected to Port Clements and Skidegate (43 km) via a paved Highway 16 in 1969.

The village frames the southern end of Naikoon Provincial Park, known for the nearby Pesuta Shipwreck, and its long stretches of sandy beach. Other tourist attractions include the Tlell River and Mayer Lake, with the Tlell river hosting many salmon in fall.
Services offered include some bed and breakfasts, a general store, several arts and crafts galleries, the Naikoon Park headquarters and a camp site.

Demographics
Some 607 people reside in the greater periphery, additionally encompassing other small communities like Tow Hill, Lawn Hill and Miller Creek.

Culture
Once every August, the Edge of the World Music Festival takes place in Tlell, as well as the Tlell Fall Fair in August; both attract many visitors from off the islands.
Apart from this there, is little municipal infrastructure and no such thing as a town center or a harbour. Tlell is rather a scattered cluster of separate homes, many of them occupied by artisans living alternative lifestyles.

Climate
The climate is generally mild with no extremes in temperature, oceanic (Cfb), very similar to the west coast of Scotland.

See also
 List of Haida villages

References

Designated places in British Columbia
Populated places in Haida Gwaii
Unincorporated settlements in British Columbia
Graham Island